Alejandro "Alex" Zuker (born April 25, 1951, Buenos Aires, Argentina) is a musician, bass player and composer.

Early work and education 
Born in Buenos Aires, Argentina, Alex Zuker has been a recording musician/composer/bassist since age 15 and became an icon a whole generation of Argentine musicians has followed. He started his musical studies in Buenos Aires' Santa Cecilia Conservatory at age 8. After touring and recording with important Argentine bands like Pedro y Pablo (Trova) and Mahatma (Polygram), he traveled to the United States where he attended composition courses at Berklee College of Music. He returned to Argentina in 1974 and formed tango fusion band ALAS together with Gustavo Moretto and Carlos Gustavo Riganti. Mr. Zuker was ALAS' original bass guitar player and co-arranger. They toured extensively throughout South America.  In 1980 he had a personal encounter with John Lennon, the details of which have been retold by the media through different sources like Universo Beat Radio, Pagina12, the renown USA FM radio franchise Breakfast With The Beatles and others. As guest bassist he toured with nationally with the renown tango fusion group Tanghetto in July 2018, which culminated with a sold-out performance at NYC's Lincoln Center.

Career and present work 
Alex Zuker has also worked as a bassist and writer with prominent names like Edgar Winter, Steve Katz, Miguel Cantilo, Nito Mestre, Excalibur, Innocents, Beledo, Alias4, Cumbo, Los Iracundos and others. “He has recorded sixteen albums”, written children and film music and produced other artists.

Discography 
Estoy En La Carcel. Los Shimmy Devines. Ion 1968
Conesa.  Pedro y Pablo. Trova 1971
Descalzos En El Espacio. Mahatma. Polygram 1972
Aire/Mi Viejo Rincon.  Alas. EMI 1974
Alas. Alas. EMI 1975
The Game. Melange. Josandra 1980
Love Above All. Excalibur. Blue Sky 1983
Come On. Edgar Winter Group. Blue Sky 1986
Living In Argentina. Innocents. Evolution 1995
Innocents.  Innocents. Evolution 1996
Baila Tango.  Almango. Parker 2000
Pinta Tu Aldea. Alas. Indy 2002
Mimame Bandoneon.  Alas. Sonoram 2003
Realidad Y Supersticion. Alias4. Park Slope 2004

References

External links
 Alasmusic.com
 

1951 births
Living people
Argentine bass guitarists